Georges Monca (	23 October 1867 – 26 December 1939) was a French film director. He was extremely prolific, making nearly four hundred films during his career - mainly during the silent era.  His shorts Rigadin Directeur de Cinéma and Rigadin et le Chien de la Baronne were preserved by the Academy Film Archive in 2010.

Selected filmography
 Romain Kalbris (1923)
 Lucile (1927)
 Billeting Order (1932)

References

Bibliography
 Goble, Alan. The Complete Index to Literary Sources in Film. Walter de Gruyter, 1999.

External links

1867 births
1939 deaths
French male film actors
French film directors